Easington, Oxfordshire may refer to:
Easington, Cherwell
Easington, South Oxfordshire